Rhabdopleura is a genus of colonial sessile hemichordates belonging to the Pterobranchia class. As one of the oldest living genera with a fossil record dating back to the Middle Cambrian, it is also considered to be the only living genus of graptolites.

Rhabdopleura is the best studied pterobranch in developmental biology. Research in the 2010s by Jörg Maletz and other paleontologists and biologists have demonstrated that Rhabdopleura is an extant graptolite.

Species
List of species from Maletz (2014):

Living species
The genus Rhabdopleura contains at least five living species.

 Rhabdopleura annulata Norman 1921 — Indo-Pacific region
 Rhabdopleura compacta Hincks 1880 — Atlantic
 Rhabdopleura normani Allmann, 1869 — Atlantic and parts of the Pacific
 Rhabdopleura recondita Beli, Cameron and Piraino, 2018 — Mediterranean
 Rhabdopleura striata Schepotieff 1909 — Pacific (Sri Lanka)

Nomen dubium (doubtful)
 Rhabdopleura grimaldi  Julien 1890 nomen dubium
 Rhabdopleura manubialis Jullien & Calvet 1903 nomen dubium

Extinct species
 †Rhabdopleura delmari Mortelmans 1955
 †Rhabdopleura graysoni Chapman, Durman & Rickards 1995
 †Rhabdopleura hollandi Rickards, Chapman & Temple 1984
 †Rhabdopleura kozlowskii Kulicki 1969
 †Rhabdopleura obuti Durman & Sennikov 1993
 †Rhabdopleura sinica Chapman, Durman & Rickards 1995
 †Rhabdopleura vistulae Kozlowski 1956

Fossil record
The fossil record for Rhabdopleura dates back to the Middle Cambrian. There are also Rhabdopleura fossils from the Eocene.

References

Graptolites
Hemichordate genera
Extant Cambrian first appearances